Anthony O'Brien, is a director  as well as a writer, producer, and editor. He grew up in Seattle, Washington and currently resides in Los Angeles, California. He is best known as the director of the feature film The Timber, starring Josh Peck and James Ransone. His directorial debut Perfect Sport won multiple awards.

Awards
O'Brien co-starred in his directorial debut Perfect Sport, which was an official selection at Seattle International Film Festival and went on to win the SIFF People's Choice award. It also won the National Film Festival for Talented Youth Audience Award, and the Gold Remi award for Best Dramatic Feature Film at Worldfest Houston.

His second feature film The Timber was picked up for distribution nationally and internationally  and was released in the United States in 2015.

Filmography

References

External links
Anthony O'Brien Home Page
Anthony O'Brien's Blog about Filmmaking

American male screenwriters
Year of birth missing (living people)
Writers from Seattle
Living people
Film directors from Oregon
Writers from Los Angeles
Film directors from Los Angeles
Screenwriters from California
Screenwriters from Washington (state)